Gushkejan (also Romanized as Gūshkejān; also known as Gashkījān, Gishkadzhan, Gīshkajān, and Kūshkejān) is a village in Lafmejan Rural District, in the Central District of Lahijan County, Gilan Province, Iran. At the 2006 census, its population was 211, in 75 families.

References 

Populated places in Lahijan County